The Knockout is a 1925 silent film drama directed by Lambert Hillyer and starring Milton Sills. It was based on the novel The Come-Back by Morris DeCamp Crawford. It was produced by and released by First National Pictures.

Plot
As described in a film magazine reviews, Sandy Donlin, world’s light heavyweight boxing champion, hurts his right arm and is told by his doctor that, if he uses the arm in the fight, he will never use it again. Because he thinks the arm useless, he accepts the offer of the lumberman Parker to become his manager in a Canadian lumber camp. Donlin accepts because he has just met and fallen in love with Jean Farot, daughter of Parker’s rival. Parker wants Donlin at the camp because he can whip Jack Ducane, the foreman for Farot, who has blocked the efforts of Parker’s men to jam Farot’s logs. Ducane accuses Donlin of getting the Farot loggers drunk to cause them to jam the logs. Donlin learns in the ensuing fight that the right arm has healed. Parker’s men blow up Farot’s dam and jam the river with logs. Donlin offers to break the jam and unsuccessfully tries dynamite. Jean loses faith in Donlin’s love because she thinks he is in the plot against her father, who is in Parker’s debt. Donlin goes to New York, wins another championship fight, pays Farot’s debt, and permanently establishes himself in Jean’s favor.

Cast

Preservation
With no prints of The Knockout located in any film archives, it is now lost film. Just the trailer survives in the Library of Congress collection.

References

External links

1925 films
1925 lost films
American silent feature films
Lost American films
Films based on American novels
Films directed by Lambert Hillyer
First National Pictures films
American black-and-white films
1925 drama films
Silent American drama films
Films with screenplays by Joseph F. Poland
Lost drama films
1920s American films